Chisocheton lasiocarpus is a species of tree in the genus Chisocheton of the Mahogany Family (Meliaceae). It is a sparsely branched, slightly buttressed, somewhat stout mesocaul or rather slender pachycaul tree of the western New Guinea rainforest rising  to 110 feet (33 meters) in height, and possibly the only such tree with a weeping habit, the huge terminal rosettes of five foot (1.5 meter) long pinnate leaves of the lower branches facing down toward the earth. Like all Chisochetons, C. lasiocarpus has indeterminate leaves with a tiny circinate bud at the tip of each leaf which produces a new pair of leaflets every few weeks or months over a period of several years, each leaf eventually reaching five feet (1.5 meters) in length. There are 9 to 11 pairs of leaflets at a time (the oldest may die as new ones are formed).  Each leaflet can be up to 18 inches (45 centimeters) long by up to nine inches (23 centimeters) in width.  The flowers are white or pink, tubular, about a half inch (one cm) long with 4 or 5 petals and 7 or 8 stamens. The tree is "myrmecophilous" (has a symbiotic relationship with certain ant species).  C. lasiocarpus is a highly variable species.

References 

lasiocarpus